is an action game for the Nintendo 64. It was released only in Japan in 1998, and is compatible with Super B-Daman: Fighting Phoenix via the Transfer Pak.

See also
B-Daman

External links
The B-Daman Wiki Forums, a community dedicated to B-Daman

1998 video games
B-Daman
Games with Transfer Pak support
Japan-exclusive video games
Nintendo 64 games
Nintendo 64-only games
Rail shooters
Video games based on Takara Tomy toys
Video games developed in Japan